Hawf District is a district of the Al Mahrah Governorate, Yemen. As of 2003, the district had a population of 5,143 inhabitants. The Hawf Area was nomination to be a natural UNESCO World Heritage Site in August 2002. Current the status is listed as tentatively approved.

Climate
In Hawf, the climate is hot and dry. Most rain falls in the winter. The Köppen-Geiger climate classification is Bwh. About  of precipitation falls annually.

References

Districts of Al Mahrah Governorate